Calcium pumps are a family of ion transporters found in the cell membrane of all animal cells. They are responsible for the active transport of calcium out of the cell for the maintenance of the steep Ca2+ electrochemical gradient across the cell membrane. Calcium pumps play a crucial role in proper cell signalling by keeping the intracellular calcium concentration roughly 10,000 times lower than the extracellular concentration.  Failure to do so is one cause of muscle cramps.

The plasma membrane Ca2+ ATPase and the sodium-calcium exchanger are together the main regulators of intracellular Ca2+ concentrations.

Biological role 

Ca2+ has many important roles as an intracellular messenger. The release of a large amount of free Ca2+ can trigger a fertilized egg to develop, skeletal muscle cells to contract, secretion by secretory cells and interactions with Ca2+ -responsive proteins like calmodulin. To maintain low concentrations of free Ca2+ in the cytosol, cells use membrane pumps like calcium ATPase found in the membranes of sarcoplasmic reticulum of skeletal muscle. These pumps are needed to provide the steep electrochemical gradient that allows Ca2+ to rush into the cytosol when a stimulus signal opens the Ca2+ channels in the membrane. The pumps are also necessary to actively pump the Ca2+ back out of the cytoplasm and return the cell to its pre-signal state.

Crystallography of calcium pumps
The structure of calcium pumps found in the sarcoplasmic reticulum of skeletal muscle was elucidated in 2000 by Toyoshima, et al. using microscopy of tubular crystals and 3D microcrystals. The pump has a molecular mass of 110,000 amu, shows three well separated cytoplasmic domains, with a transmembrane domain consisting of ten alpha helices and two transmembrane Ca2+ binding sites.

Mechanism
Classical theory of active transport for P-type ATPases

Data from crystallography studies by Chikashi Toyoshima applied to the above cycle

References 

Cell biology
Transport proteins

nl:Sarcolemmale calciumpomp